Guillem Areny Areny (died 30 December 2020) was an Andorran politician who served as a member of the Council General and mayor (cònsol major) of La Massana.

References

1930s births
2020 deaths
Andorran politicians